Melissa Louise Belote (born October 16, 1956), also known by her current married name Melissa Belote Ripley, is an American former competition swimmer, three-time Olympic champion, and former world record-holder in two events.  She represented the United States at the 1972 and 1976 Olympics.

Career

Belote was born in Washington, D.C.  She grew up in Springfield, Virginia, was a member of the Springfield Swim and Racquet Club, and attended Robert E. Lee High School in Fairfax County, Virginia.

At 15 years old, she won three gold medals at the 1972 Summer Olympics in Munich, Germany.  In the women's 100-meter backstroke, Belote defeated her American teammate and world-record holder Susie Atwood.  In the women's 200-meter backstroke, Belote set a new world record of 2:19.19.  She won a third gold medal by swimming the lead-off backstroke leg for the winning U.S. team in the women's 4×100-meter medley relay.  She and her teammates Cathy Carr (breaststroke), Deena Deardurff (butterfly), and Sandy Neilson (freestyle) set a new world record of 4:20.75 in the relay final.

She attended Arizona State University, where she swam for the Arizona State Sun Devils swimming and diving team in Association for Intercollegiate Athletics for Women (AIAW) competition.  She received the Honda Sports Award for Swimming and Diving, recognizing her as the outstanding college female swimmer of the year in 1976–77.

She retired from the sport in 1979, and was inducted in the International Swimming Hall of Fame in 1983.  She was also inducted into the Virginia Sports Hall of Fame in 1989.

She currently coaches swimming and diving at McClintock High School in Tempe, Arizona, and also coaches the Rio Salado Swim Team.

See also
 List of members of the International Swimming Hall of Fame
 List of Arizona State University alumni
 List of multiple Olympic gold medalists
 List of Olympic medalists in swimming (women)
 List of World Aquatics Championships medalists in swimming (women)
 World record progression 200 metres backstroke
 World record progression 4 × 100 metres medley relay

References

External links

 

1956 births
Living people
American female backstroke swimmers
Arizona State Sun Devils women's swimmers
World record setters in swimming
Medalists at the 1972 Summer Olympics
Olympic gold medalists for the United States in swimming
Swimmers from Washington, D.C.
Swimmers at the 1972 Summer Olympics
Swimmers at the 1976 Summer Olympics
World Aquatics Championships medalists in swimming
20th-century American women
21st-century American women